Emmanuel François (born 25 January 2000) is a professional footballer who plays as a winger for  club Paris 13 Atletico. Born in France, he plays for the Haiti national team.

Club career
A youth product of Sochaux, François began his career with their reserves before joining Rodez's reserves in 2020. He transferred to Lusitanos Saint-Maur in the Championnat National 2 in the summer of 2021. On 25 June 2022, François signed for Championnat National side Paris 13 Atletico.

International career
Born in France, François is of Haitian descent. He represented the Haiti U23s at the 2020 CONCACAF Men's Olympic Qualifying Championship. He made his debut with the Haiti in a friendly 6–1 loss to Bahrain on 2 September 2021, scoring his side's only goal.

International goals

References

External links
 
 

2000 births
Living people
People from Orange, Vaucluse
Sportspeople from Vaucluse
Footballers from Provence-Alpes-Côte d'Azur
French footballers
French sportspeople of Haitian descent
Black French sportspeople
Haitian footballers
Haiti international footballers
Haiti youth international footballers
Association football wingers
FC Sochaux-Montbéliard players
Rodez AF players
US Lusitanos Saint-Maur players
Paris 13 Atletico players
Championnat National 2 players
Championnat National 3 players
Championnat National players